is a museum that displays the history of Tsuruga Port, located in Kanegasaki Park, Tsuruga, Fukui, Japan. It emphasizes Chiune Sugihara, who saved the lives of many Jewish refugees during World War II by issuing transit visas.  Tsuruga Port was the place they disembarked after their long journey from their native Europe.

Exhibition

The main exhibit covers the history of Tsuruga Port.  Since early times, Tsuruga Port has connected Japan to the Asian continent.  Especially starting from the Meiji period to the early Showa period, it enjoyed its heyday by serving as a departing point connecting Japan to the terminus of the Trans-Siberian Railroad at Vladivostok.

The exhibit highlight the activities of Chiune Sugihara (also pronounced as Senpo Sugihara).  While he served as an acting  consul of Japanese Consulate in Kaunas, Lithuania, he saved the lives of many Jews persecuted by Nazis by issuing transit visa, ignoring the directives of the Japanese Ministry of Foreign Affairs.  The Tsuruga Port was the first point of disembarkation on Japanese territory after a long and harsh journey from Europe via Trans-Siberian Railroad.  The museum explains how the local citizens warmly supported the Jewish refugees during their short stay in Tsuruga before they departed for further journeys to their final destinations by exhibitions and interviews with those who survived, as well as their descendants.

"ムゼウム" is a Japanese transliteration of the word "museum" in Polish, based on the fact that many of the Jewish refugees originated from Poland.

Access
The museum is about 30 minute walk from Tsuruga Station of JR Hokuriku Main Line, or an eight minute bus ride (Tsuruga Shuyu bus) from Tsuruga Station to Kanegasaki Park, followed by about a four minute walk.

Open date
Closed December 29-January 1.  Opens at 9:00 and closes at 17:00 (admission closes at 16:30).

References

Related Articles
 Chiune Sugihara
 The Chiune Sugihara Memorial Hall, located in Yaotsu, Kamo, Gifu prefecture. 
 Tsuruga Port

Other nearby attractions
Tsuruga Port - Kanagasaki park - Kirameki-minato kan - Former Tsuruga port station building (Tsuruga railway museum) - Takatoro Tall Stone Lantern at Suzaki - Lamp house - Tsuruga warehouses - Tsuruga Red Brick Warehouse
Tsuruga Municipal Museum
Minato Tsuruga Yama Kaikan
Kami-Warabe Washi-Paper Doll Museum
Kehi Shrine

External links
 Official Webpage
 
 Tsuruga Tourism Association
 Fukui Tourist Guide

Museums in Fukui Prefecture
Museums established in 2008
Tsuruga, Fukui
Holocaust museums
Jewish Japanese history
History museums in Japan